Designed by Frank Lloyd Wright in 1953 and completed in 1954, the John and Syd Dobkins House is one of three Wright-designed Usonian houses in Canton, Ohio. Located farther east than the Nathan Rubin Residence and the Ellis A. Feiman House, it is set back from the road. It's a modest sized home with two bedrooms, and one and a half baths. Its distinctive geometric design module is based upon an equilateral triangle (unit size 4 feet). The mortar in the deep red bricks was deeply raked to emphasize the horizontal. (Storrer: 388)

Construction was supervised by Allan J. Gelbin, a Wright apprentice the architect sent from the Taliesin Fellowship. Gelbin acted as construction supervisor and contractor on this building as well as the two other buildings in Canton (the Rubin and Feiman houses). (Storrer: 388) The Gelbin house was built on a five-acre parcel that was once a cornfield. Along with a design for the house, Wright created an ingenious planting plan for the property which featured 14 pin oak trees planted in perfect relation to the structure.

The home was purchased and restored by current homeowners, Dan and Dianne Chrzanowski.

References

 Storrer, William Allin. The Frank Lloyd Wright Companion. University Of Chicago Press, 2006,  (S.362)

External links
 State Board Recommends 16 Ohio Nominations To The National Register Of Historic Places
 Frank Lloyd Wright - Wright in Ohio The Houses That Frank Built
 Design Strategies » They Made Their Mark
 Frank Lloyd Wright Building Guide - Ohio

Frank Lloyd Wright buildings
Houses in Stark County, Ohio
National Register of Historic Places in Stark County, Ohio
Buildings and structures in Canton, Ohio